Rollin is the seventh extended play by South Korean boy group B1A4. It was released on September 25, 2017 by WM Entertainment and distributed by LOEN Entertainment. The EP consisted of six tracks with the title track "Rollin'". This is also the last album with the members Jinyoung and Baro, before their departure from the group in June 2018.

Background and release
On September 18, 2017, WM Entertainment announced the upcoming release of B1A4's mini-album Rollin on September 27, alongside a teaser schedule and three jacket images shot in Australia. The tracklisting was revealed on September 19, 2017.

Track listing

Charts

Weekly charts

Monthly charts

Release history

References

B1A4 EPs
2017 EPs